Albert Evelyn Dewes (April 1860 – 5 July 1892) was a New Zealand cricketer. He played two first-class matches for Auckland between 1882 and 1884.

Dewes worked as a solicitor in Auckland. He died at his home in the Auckland suburb of Parnell of influenza and tuberculosis. He left a widow and four young daughters.

See also
 List of Auckland representative cricketers

References

External links
 

1860 births
1892 deaths
New Zealand cricketers
Auckland cricketers
Sportspeople from Nuneaton
Deaths from influenza
19th-century deaths from tuberculosis
Tuberculosis deaths in New Zealand